Andrea Lehmann (born 1975) is an artist based in Germany.

Andrea Lehmann was born in Düsseldorf. She attended the Kunstakademie in Düsseldorf in 1995 and gained her MA in 2000.

She has also exhibited at The Rubell Museum, Jack Tilton (New York), Michael+Susan Hort Collection (New York), Saatchi Gallery (London), Mera and Don Rubell (Miami), Museum of Glass (Tacoma), and Kravetz/Wehby Gallery (New York).

References

General references
 Tewes, Johanna (2010): Phantastische Bildwelten zwischen Gothic, Kitsch und Mythologie. Die  künstlerischen Strategien Andrea Lehmanns und ihre didaktischen Schnittstellen (KONTEXT: Kunst - Vermittlung - Kulturelle Bildung, Band 5). .

External links
Andrea Lehmann at the Saatchi Gallery
Rubell Family Collection

1975 births
Living people
Artists from Düsseldorf
20th-century German painters
German women painters
21st-century German women artists
21st-century German painters